Chonggakmu or Chonggak radish, also called ponytail radish, is a variety of white radish. It is a small radish with many fine roots; of which the entire plant, including the leaves and stems, is used in Korean cuisine.

Names and etymology 
The Korean word chonggakmu is a compound of chonggak ("bachelor") and mu ("radish"). In premodern Korea, unmarried men and boys pulled their hair into a long braid, while married adult men wore their hair in sangtu, a topknot. On the day of the coming of age ceremony, a boy's braid was undone and it was first made into chonggak, hornlike double topknots, before it was undone again and be made into sangtu. As the shape of chonggak radishes resembled the shape of chonggak hair, it came to be called by the name of chonggak radish.

Description 

The taproots of the radish weigh , and are about ten to thirteen times smaller than a regular Korean radish. The upper part of the roots are subterranean stems, from which the long ovate leaves grow.

Culinary use 
Radish greens, called mucheong, is dried to make siraegi or used fresh in cooking. Whole, vertically halved, or quartered chonggak radishes along with the leaves and stems are often used to make kimchi, called chonggak-kimchi, with the seasonings similar to those of kkakdugi (radish kimchi). Chonggak radishes can also be used to make dongchimi, a soupy winter radish kimchi.

See also 
 Korean radish
 Gegeol radish
 Young summer radish

References 

Asian radishes
Korean vegetables
Leaf vegetables
Root vegetables